John Parker Gregg (September 14, 1876 – June 11, 1963) was an American college football player and coach. He served as the head football coach at Louisiana State University (LSU) for one season in 1899, compiling a record of 2–4. Gregg graduated from high school in Madison, Wisconsin and was a graduate of the University of Wisconsin–Madison, where he lettered in football and baseball. Gregg was a halfback and a quarterback on the football team, and lettered in 1895 and 1897. During World War I he served as a captain in the Judge Advocate's Office.

Gregg was born on September 14, 1876, in Elm Grove, Wisconsin. He died on June 11, 1963, as a hospital in Independence, Iowa.

Head coaching record

References

External links
 

1876 births
1963 deaths
19th-century players of American football
American football quarterbacks
LSU Tigers football coaches
Wisconsin Badgers baseball players
Wisconsin Badgers football players
United States Army personnel of World War I
Sportspeople from Madison, Wisconsin
People from Elm Grove, Wisconsin
Coaches of American football from Wisconsin
Players of American football from Wisconsin
Baseball players from Wisconsin
Military personnel from Wisconsin